Bert van Leeuwen (born 21 March 1960) is a Dutch television presenter.
He is known for presenting many television programs for the broadcasting association Evangelische Omroep, in particular Het Familiediner, De Grootste Royaltykenner van Nederland, De Grote Bijbelquiz and That's the Question.

In 2018, he was the procession reporter in that year's edition of The Passion, a Dutch Passion Play held every Maundy Thursday since 2011.

Personal life 

His son Laurens van Leeuwen is married to Dutch model Romee Strijd.

References

External links 

 

1960 births
Living people
Dutch game show hosts
21st-century Dutch people